Bark River-Harris School District is a school district headquartered in Harris, Michigan. It includes sections of Delta County and Menominee County: Bark River Township in Delta County, and the majority of Harris Township in Menominee County.

It is served by the Delta-Schoolcraft Intermediate School District.

History
In 2018 the Hannahville Indian Community gave the district $3.9 million so it could build an expansion, and voters passed a millage so the remainder of the funds for expansion could be obtained. In June 2019 the expansion and renovation project began. The total cost was $4 million. The expansion is to house the child development facility.

Student body
Most students live in the settlements of Harris, Bark River, Schaffer, and Wilson.

Circa 1975 the average class size was 30 students. The Native American students reported discrimination and had a dropout rate of 85%, prompting the tribe to establish the Hannahville Indian School.

References

External links
 Bark River-Harris School District
School districts in Michigan
Education in Delta County, Michigan
Education in Menominee County, Michigan